Katrina Mitchell may refer to:
 Katie Mitchell, an English theatre director
 Katrina Mitchell, a Scottish musician who is a member of The Pastels